Throughout his life, Frank Sinatra, the musician and actor, was involved in many different political activities in the United States. He also held positive views toward African Americans at a time when much of the United States still had segregation.

Political activities, 1944–1969

Sinatra held differing political views throughout his life. Sinatra's parents had immigrated to the United States in 1895 and 1897, respectively. His mother, Dolly Sinatra (1896–1977), was a Democratic Party ward leader. After sending a letter to President Franklin D. Roosevelt in support of the president's stewardship, Sinatra was invited to meet Roosevelt at the White House, where he agreed to become part of the Democratic party's voter registration drives, and heavily campaigned for the Democrats in the 1944 presidential election. He contributed $7,500 directly to the Democratic campaign fund, and was quoted by a Democratic flyer as saying "[Roosevelt] will make Young America's dream a reality". He made national broadcasts on the radio in support, spoke at Carnegie Hall, and spoke at Madison Square Garden on October 29, 1944, a week before the election.

According to Jo Carroll Silvers, in his younger years Sinatra had "ardent liberal" sympathies, and was "so concerned about poor people that he was always quoting Henry Wallace". He was outspoken on racism, particularly towards black persons and Italians from early on. In November 1945 Sinatra was invited by the mayor of Gary, Indiana to try to settle a strike by white students of Froebel High School against the "Pro-Negro" policies of the new principal. Sinatra outraged the mayor with his remarks about how to address the problem, which he compared it to the racial policies of Nazism, and criticized the people involved in the dispute who had nothing to do with the school. His comments, while praised by liberal publications, led to accusations by some that he was a Communist. Sinatra responded by saying: "I don't like Communists, and I have nothing against any organization except the Knights of Columbus".

In the 1948 presidential election, Sinatra actively campaigned for President Harry S. Truman. In 1952 and 1956, he also campaigned for Adlai Stevenson.

Of all the U.S. Presidents he associated with during his career, he was closest to John F. Kennedy. Sinatra often invited Kennedy to Hollywood and Las Vegas, and the two would enjoy parties together. Kennedy enjoyed hearing inside gossip about the stars and their romances from him.  In 1960 Sinatra and his friends – Peter Lawford, Dean Martin, and Sammy Davis Jr. – actively campaigned for Kennedy throughout the United States; A specially recorded version of "High Hopes" with lyrics praising Kennedy, frequently was played during the 1960 presidential election. In January 1961 Sinatra and Peter Lawford organized the Inaugural Gala in Washington, DC, held on the evening before President Kennedy was sworn into office. The event, featuring many notable entertainment figures, was an enormous success, raising a large amount of money for the Democratic Party. However, Sinatra and Kennedy's friendship started unraveling after Kennedy was sworn in and began cutting ties with Mafia-affiliated Sinatra. Though they reconciled at one point, Kennedy was still wary of the political damage he would get by keeping ties with Sinatra, who still maintained affiliations with the Mafia and never shook off rumors of it.

Sinatra's move toward the Republican Party seems to have begun when he was snubbed by President Kennedy in favor of Bing Crosby, a fellow singer and a Republican, for Kennedy's visit to Palm Springs, in 1962. Kennedy had planned to stay at Sinatra's home over the Easter holiday weekend, but decided to stay with Crosby because of Sinatra's alleged connections to organized crime. Sinatra had invested a lot of his own money in upgrading the facilities at his home in anticipation of the President's visit, fitting it with a heliport and building a large guest house to seat 40 people. Sinatra was fuming and "deeply humiliated" at being rejected, smashing up the concrete of the heliport himself with a sledgehammer. He blamed Lawford and Bobby Kennedy for the decision, and created a rift between Lawford and the other Rat Pack members, cutting him out of subsequent films. Yet Sinatra never said a bad word about Kennedy himself, and despite the humiliation and change in political affiliation, he still mourned when Kennedy was assassinated. According to his daughter Nancy, Sinatra learned of Kennedy's assassination while filming a scene of Robin and the 7 Hoods in Burbank. Sinatra quickly finished filming the scene, returned to his Palm Springs home, and sobbed in his bedroom for three days. When he learned that Kennedy's killer Lee Harvey Oswald had watched Suddenly just days before the assassination, he withdrew it from circulation, and it only became distributed again in the late 1980s.

Political activities, 1970–1984

Sinatra remained a supporter of the Democratic Party until the early 1970s when he switched his allegiance to the Republican Party as the Democratic Party under George McGovern took a sharp turn to the left that was in conflict with his more traditional values. The first sign of Sinatra's break from the Democratic Party came in 1970 when he endorsed Ronald Reagan for a second term as Governor of California; Sinatra, however, remained a registered Democrat and encouraged Reagan to become more moderate. In July 1972, after a lifetime of supporting Democratic presidential candidates, Sinatra announced he could not support the left-ward turn of the party and its candidate, George McGovern, and would therefore support Republican U.S. President Richard Nixon for re-election in the 1972 presidential election. His switch to the Republican Party was now official; he even told his daughter, Tina, who had actively campaigned for McGovern, "the older you get, the more conservative you get." Sinatra said he agreed with the Republican Party on most positions. During Nixon's presidency, Sinatra visited the White House on several occasions.

From the late 1960s onward, Sinatra was outspoken about various conflicts in the Middle East. On the eve of the Six-Day War in 1967 he reportedly sent a wire to President Lyndon Johnson "urging him to condemn the 'outrageous' actions of Egyptian leader Gamal Abdel Nasser". He gave a concert at the Great Pyramids in 1979 to raise money to support the campaign of President Anwar Sadat, whom he considered a "great man who's laying the cornerstone of peace for all the Arab nations". In 1982, during the Israeli–Lebanon conflict, Sinatra expressed hope that Yasser Arafat would be caught and executed.

Sinatra helped establish two intercultural centers in Israel, the Frank Sinatra Brotherhood and Friendship Center for Arab and Israeli Children in Nazareth, and the Frank Sinatra International Student Center at the Hebrew University of Jerusalem, Mount Scopus campus. The latter center was bombed on July 31, 2002, by Hamas, killing 9 and injuring nearly 100.

In the 1980 presidential election, Sinatra supported Ronald Reagan and donated $4 million to Reagan's campaign. He sponsored the initial fundraising campaign in the northeast, raising over $250,000 in Boston. Sinatra referred to Reagan as "the proper man to be the President of the United States ... it's so screwed up now, we need someone to straighten it out." Reagan's victory gave Sinatra his closest relationship with the White House since the early 1960s. Sinatra arranged Reagan's presidential gala, as he had done for Kennedy 20 years previously. In 1984, Sinatra returned to his birthplace in Hoboken, bringing with him President Reagan, who was in the midst of campaigning for the 1984 presidential election. Reagan had made Sinatra a fund-raising ambassador as part of the Republican National Committee's "Victory '84 Get-Out-The-Vote" (GOTV) drive. 

Sinatra fell silent in the political world in the years leading up to his passing, focusing his attention towards his music, friends and family.

Racial activism
From his youth, Sinatra displayed sympathy for African Americans and worked both publicly and privately all his life to help them win equal rights. He blamed racial prejudice on the parents of children. In 1947 Sinatra remarked: "We've got a hell of a way to go in this racial situation. As long as most white men think of a Negro as a Negro first and a man second, we're in trouble. I don't know why we can't grow up. It took us long enough to get past the stage where we were calling all Italians 'wops' and 'dagos', but if we don't stop this 'nigger' thing, we just won't be around much longer." Sinatra felt so strongly about prejudice that Orson Welles recalled one incident where he slugged the bartender of a saloon because he refused to serve his friend, a black musician. He had won an honorary Oscar in 1945 for the anti-racist short film The House I Live In.

Sinatra played a major role in the desegregation of Nevada hotels and casinos in the 1950s and 1960s, often stepping in to demand apologies for a racist incident and abolishing of Jim Crow policies before he would fulfill his show contract. At the Sands in 1955, Sinatra noticed that he never saw Nat King Cole in the dining room, always eating his meals in solitude in his dressing room. When he asked his valet George to find out why, he learned that "Coloreds aren't allowed in the dining room at the Sands". Sinatra subsequently saw to it that if blacks were not permitted to eat their meals in the dining room with everybody else he would see to it that all of the waiters and waitresses were fired, and invited Cole to dine with him the following evening. Sinatra and Sammy Davis Jr. were instrumental in bringing about a general change in policy. In 1961, an African-American couple entered the lobby of the hotel and were blocked by the security guard, witnessed by Sinatra and Davis. Sinatra told the guards that they were his guests and let them into the hotel. Sinatra subsequently swore profusely down the phone to Sands executive Carl Cohen at how ridiculous the situation was, and the following day, Davis approached Jack Entratter and the hotel soon began hiring black waiters and busboys. Sinatra's support for Sammy Davis Jr., however, did not stop the occasional racially insensitive comment from him and the other Rat Pack members at concerts.

On January 27, 1961, Sinatra played a benefit show at Carnegie Hall for Martin Luther King Jr. and led his fellow Rat Pack members and Reprise label mates in boycotting hotels and casinos that refused entry to black patrons and performers. He often spoke from the stage on desegregation and repeatedly played benefits on behalf of King and his movement. According to his son, Frank Sinatra Jr., King sat weeping in the audience at one of his father's concerts in 1963 as Sinatra sang Ol' Man River, a song from the musical Show Boat that is sung by an African-American stevedore. His well-known support for African-Americans was the subject of a piece in the Chicago Tribune by Laura S. Washington. When he changed his political affiliations in 1970, Sinatra became less outspoken on racial issues.

In 1981, Sinatra performed in Sun City, South Africa, at a time when he believed that Bophuthatswana was an independent country; the apartheid regime had nominally declared it independent, which was not recognized by any country other than South Africa. He was heavily criticized for performing there, and the official from the National Congress of South Africa was quoted in saying "He is trying to pretend that he's going to a separate state, which it is not. We don't recognize Bophuthatswana as a separate state of South Africa, and our policy is the same as if he agreed to perform in South Africa. He is saying that black people of South Africa should be living on 13% of the land."

Notes

References

Sources

External links

Frank Sinatra
Sinatra, Frank
American anti-communists